Agrotis mesotoxa is a moth of the family Noctuidae. It is endemic to Kauai, Maui and Hawaii.

External links
Organisms of Hawaii

Agrotis
Endemic moths of Hawaii
Moths described in 1899